A clay drum is a variety of percussion instrument found in various parts of the world. It may refer to:

Idiophones
Ghatam, from India
Udu, from Nigeria

Membranophones
 Alligator drum once used in Neolithic China, made from clay and alligator hides
Goblet drum, from the Middle East
Khol, from India
Kus, from Iran
Madal, from Nepal
Mrdanga, from India
Naqareh, from the Middle East, Central Asia, and India
Tassa, used by Indo-Caribbeans
Tumdak', from India

Drums